Tallahassee is the capital of the U.S. state of Florida.

Tallahassee may also refer to:

Film and television 
 Tallahassee, a character in Zombieland, played by Woody Harrelson
 "Tallahassee (The Office)", an eighth-season episode of The Office (U.S. TV series)
 "Tallahassee (Once Upon a Time)", a second-season episode of Once Upon a Time (TV series)
 Tallahassee 7000 (1961), an American crime drama television series 
 "The Man from Tallahassee", a third-season episode of Lost (TV series)

Music 
 Tallahassee (album), a 2002 album by the Mountain Goats
 "Tallahassee Lassie", a 1960 song by Freddy Cannon

Places 
 Tallahassee metropolitan area, the region encompassing Tallahassee and its suburbs
 Tallahassee, Georgia, an unincorporated community in Jeff Davis County, Georgia, USA
 Tallahassee Creek, a stream in the U.S. state of Georgia

Ships 
 CSS Tallahassee, a steamer in the Confederate States Navy
 USS Tallahassee, several United States Navy ships

Sports

Baseball 
 Tallahassee Capitals
 Tallahassee Rebels

Football 
 Tallahassee Jewels
 Tallahassee Thunder
 Tallahassee Titans

Golf 
 Tallahassee Open
 Tallahassee Open (Nationwide Tour event)

Ice hockey 
 Tallahassee Tide
 Tallahassee Tiger Sharks

Roller derby 
 Tallahassee RollerGirls

Running 
 Tallahassee Marathon

Soccer 
 Tallahassee SC
 Tallahassee Scorpions
 Tallahassee Tempest

Tennis 
 Tallahassee Tennis Challenger

See also
List of people from Tallahassee, Florida